Rashidjon Aleksandrovich Gafurov (born 26 September 1977) is a former Uzbekistani International footballer who played as a midfielder.

Career statistics

Club

International

Statistics accurate as of 17 March 2016

International goals

Honours
Navbahor Namangan
Uzbek Cup (1): 1998
Bunyodkor
Uzbek League (1): 2008
Uzbek Cup (1): 2008

References

External links

1977 births
Living people
Uzbekistani footballers
Uzbekistan international footballers
Navbahor Namangan players
Sportspeople from Tashkent
Association football midfielders
Footballers at the 1998 Asian Games
Asian Games competitors for Uzbekistan